Akbulak may refer to:

Akbulak, Kazakhstan
Akbulak, Russia, a rural locality (a settlement) in Akbulaksky District of Orenburg Oblast, Russia
Akbulak, Kulp
 Akbulak, Karakoçan

See also
Ağbulaq (disambiguation)
Ak-Bulak (disambiguation)
Aq Bolagh (disambiguation)
Aq Bulaq (disambiguation)